The Birimi site is an archaeological site in Northern Ghana, Africa, between the towns of Gambaga and Nalerigu. It’s most notable for its history of occupation during the Middle Stone Age, Late Stone Age and Iron Age. It’s connection to the Kintampo Complex makes this a notable archaeological site.

Site 
The Birimi site was discovered in the Northern regions of Ghana in West Africa. The site lies on the Gambaga escarpment, about 3.5 kilometers to the northwest of the town of Nalerigu.  Excavations of the site begun in the year 1987, led by Francois Kense. These were also the first excavations in the wider area around this site. The Birimi site sits mainly in a system of seasonal stream channels. The banks of these streams are covered with lithic artefacts, showing signs of extractive activities

Middle Stone Age 
The oldest occupation phase from the site of Birimi can be dated to the Middle Stone Age. The layers from this time period were excavated in the campaign of 1996. The material finds consist of a variety of different lithic artefact forms including Levallois flakes and cores, disk cores, blades, bifaces, notches, denticulates and retouched flakes and blades. In situ artefacts can be found 1 meter below today’s surface. These finds are however not easily linked to other contemporary cultures from the Middle Stone Age. This mostly because the Middle Stone Age in West Africa is not very well known in general

Late Stone Age 
The site of Birimi also knew occupation during the Late Stone Age where the finds are associated with the Kintampo Complex. This is associated with the origin of agriculture in sub-Saharan West Africa. This occupation phase can be dated between 3.500 and 3.000 BP. This former habitation makes for a very ceramic-rich layer on the site. This is the occupation layer of the site that has been investigated the most based on the clear presence of the Kintampo complex. Charred plant remains from this site and this period show evidence of the cultivation of pearl millet. The cultivation of this plant would have made it possible for the Kintampo people to be sedentary and make this site into an actual village. There are also indications for wattle and daub structures. There are multiple building techniques present, forming multiple structures of different sizes, something that has been noted at other Kintampo sites as well

Iron Age 
The western parts of the site also know later occupation during the Iron Age. Everywhere where Kintampo occupation was found on this site, Iron Age working sites were also found. They were excavated in campaigns between 1987 and 1988. However, no Iron Age habitations were found near the smelters. The ironworking activities can be found in the forms of multiple slag mounds and furnaces all over the western part of the site.

Research 
During all the research and excavation campaigns that took place at Birimi, lots of samples were taken to learn not only about the particular site but also to get more information about the wider region around the site. These samples include pottery, burned daub, sediment, charcoal and palaeobotanical remains for stylistic, archaeometry and/or dating purposes.

References 

Archaeological sites in Ghana